Koldewey Island is an island in Franz Josef Land, Russia.

Geography
The second-highest point Mountain of Robert-Johann in the southwest is named after Carl Koldewey's son Robert Koldewey. The island has no lakes but its single valley has a creek in the summer.

The island belongs to the Russkaya Arktika National Park since 15 June 2009. There is the same arctic climate and flora as the "mother" island Salm but Koldewey is fully unglacierized. 
The middle peak of the large bank (temporarily named Siegfried-Elof Bar) reaches just a meter and a half under the surface and lies in the Lavrov Sound  opposite to the famous Cape Tegethoff on Hall Island.

Koldewey Island is named after Captain Carl Koldewey, leader of the second German expedition to Greenland and Spitzbergen in the late 19th century.

Adjacent islands
Very close to Koldewey Island, off its northern point, lies one of the smallest islands: 
Schönau Island, Ostrov Shœnau lies in the Lavrov Sound opposite to the Hall and Berghaus Islands. It is only 90 m across.

References

Islands of Franz Josef Land